Hanging Up is a 2000 American comedy-drama film about a trio of sisters bonding over their curmudgeonly father with whom none of them were close. It was directed by Diane Keaton, and stars Keaton, Meg Ryan, Lisa Kudrow, and Walter Matthau, in his final film role. The film is based on Delia Ephron's 1995 novel of the same name. It was released on February 18, 2000 and received negative reviews from critics.

Plot
Georgia Mozell, Eve Marks and Maddy Mozell are adult sisters. Self-obsessed Georgia (Keaton) is the editor of her own wildly successful self-titled women's magazine. Maddy (Kudrow) is a vacuous soap opera actress who has always struggled for her own identity. Party planner Eve (Ryan) struggles to balance her family life with her career while also caring for their father. All three sisters are still wounded by their parents' divorce, after many years of acrimony, which resulted in their mother Pat (Leachman) essentially abandoning them all.

Despite being as busy with her own life as the others, Eve is the only one of the three who deals with the long term hospitalization of their cantankerous seventy-nine-year-old father, Lou Mozell (Matthau), when he enters the early stages of dementia and has to be hospitalized. Lou has a history of alcoholism and womanizing, and despite a hurtful incident years earlier, Eve takes charge of her father's care. In addition to answering his frequent, often incoherent phone calls, she visits him in the hospital nearly every day. Maddy occasionally visits as well, but also saddles Eve with the care of her large dog, Buck.

Flashbacks show Eve, Maddy and Georgia visiting Lou one Christmas after he attempted suicide after Pat left him. Eve confronts her mother, who admits she only had children because she believed that was what was normal, but discovered it wasn't actually what she wanted out of life. She goes back to her father and they go Christmas tree shopping together. Lou's joyful nature helps Eve to forget the pain of her mother's rejection.

In another flashback, Lou drunkenly crashes the birthday party of Eve's young son, Jesse, and when Eve tells him to leave he angrily tells her that she was a mistake. Eve's husband, outraged, forces Lou to leave and declares he's never to return to their house again.

Fed up and overwhelmed with caring for her father, siblings and an especially demanding client, Eve disconnects all the phones in her house. At an event Eve planned, where Georgia is the keynote speaker, Georgia uses Lou's illness to promote her magazine and claims that she's been more involved in his care than she actually is. Afterward, Maddy, Eve and Georgia argue viciously, until they're halted by the news that Lou's health has worsened.

All three sisters rush to the hospital and reconcile at their father's bedside. As they wait for Lou to emerge from a coma, they try to remember the name of an actress whose name Eve has been struggling to recall for weeks. Lou suddenly says it's June Allyson before passing away.

Some time later, Eve, Maddy and Georgia are together in Eve's kitchen for Thanksgiving. Eve teaches Georgia how to make her stuffing recipe, which Georgia had previously stolen and given to a newspaper as hers. Georgia and Maddy begin to playfully throw flour at each other, and Eve takes a moment to enjoy being together with her sisters before joining in.

Cast
 Meg Ryan as Eve Mozell Marks 
Paige Wolfe as Young Eve
 Diane Keaton as Georgia Mozell 
Katie Stratton as Young Georgia 
 Lisa Kudrow as Maddy Mozell 
Talia-Lynn Prairie as Young Maddy
 Walter Matthau as Lou Mozell
Charles Matthau as Young Lou
 Adam Arkin as Joe Marks
 Cloris Leachman as Pat Mozell
Kristina Dorn as Young Pat
 Jesse James as Jesse Marks 
 Edie McClurg as Esther
 Tracee Ellis Ross as Kim
 Maree Cheatham as Angie
 Myndy Crist as Dr. Kelly
 Celia Weston as Madge Turner
 Stephanie Ittleson as Victoria

Reception

Box office 
The film was released in the United States on February 18, 2000. It made $15.7 million over the four-day Presidents' Day opening weekend, finishing second behind The Whole Nine Yards. Hanging Up opened in 2,618 theatres at an average of exactly $6,000. It dropped out of the top 10 in its third week of release, and lasted eight weeks in its domestic release. The film made $36.1 million in the United States and Canada, and $15.8 million in other territories, for a worldwide total to $51.9 million.

Critical response 
On Rotten Tomatoes the film holds an approval rating of 12% based on 85 reviews, with an average rating of 3.75/10. The site's critical consensus reads, "Though the screenplay and the novel it's based on were both written by the same person, critics say Hanging Up is an unsuccessful adaptation. The acting is praised as solid, but is ultimately unable to save the film."  Audiences polled by CinemaScore gave the film an average grade of "C" on an A+ to F scale.

See also
The Pritzker Estate

References

External links
 
 

2000 films
2000 comedy-drama films
American comedy-drama films
Columbia Pictures films
Films about death
Films about sisters
Films based on American novels
Films directed by Diane Keaton
Films produced by Laurence Mark
Films scored by David Hirschfelder
Films shot in California
Films with screenplays by Nora Ephron
Films about father–daughter relationships
2000s English-language films
2000s American films